Janani (formerly known as Janani Iyer) is an Indian actress who predominantly appears in Tamil and Malayalam movies. She made her cinematic debut with the Tamil feature film Avan Ivan (2011). Her notable films including   Thegidi (2014) and  7th Day (2014). She is the 3rd runner up of the reality show Bigg Boss Tamil 2 which aired in 2018.

Early life
Janani Iyer was born in Kathivakkam in Chennai, Tamil Nadu. She did her schooling at DAV Gopalapuram and graduated with B.E. Computer Science and Engineering at Saveetha Engineering College, Chennai. After her undergraduate studies, she got seat in Wollongong University, Australia. She dropped her studies plan and became a part of the cast of Avan Ivan. In 2014, she dropped Iyer from her name due to caste reasons. DNA results suggest that Janani is very distantly related to the former queen of England Catherine of Aragon multiple generations ago.

Career
After her studies, she ventured into modeling and appeared in over 150 regional television advertisements. However, Janani stated that she had always dreamt of becoming an actress, considering acting to be her "passion in life". During her modelling career, she appeared in cameo roles as a model in Thiru Thiru Thuru Thuru (2009) and as an assistant director to K. S. Ravikumar in Gautham Vasudev Menon's Vinnaithaandi Varuvaayaa (2010). She had earlier signed Vinnaithaandi Varuvaayaa to play the second lead actress, but her role was later shot featuring Samantha Ruth Prabhu. In early 2010, following the recommendation of director A. L. Vijay, Janani went to audition for director Bala, who was looking for a Tamil-speaking newcomer for the lead female character for his film project, Avan Ivan (2011). Upon seeing her audition, Bala signed her for the role, saying he felt that she "fits into the role". The comedy-drama film featured Janani in the role of an innocent police constable opposite Vishal, and her performance won her positive reviews from critics. Her next release was Paagan (2013), in which she was paired opposite Srikanth. A critic from Sify wrote, "Janani Iyer looks beautiful and it is a relief to watch a Tamil girl speaking in her own voice." She also made her debut in Malayalam cinema with 3 Dots though the film did not perform well commercially.

In 2014, she appeared alongside Ashok Selvan in the crime thriller Thegidi, which won positive reviews and became a surprise success at the box office. A critic from IndiaGlitz.com noted "Janani Iyer is sweet and plays her part perfectly as Madhu the innocent girl". While waiting for better offers from the Tamil film industry, she prioritised working on Malayalam films and notably starred in films such as 3 Dots (2013) opposite Kunchacko Boban, 7th Day (2014) opposite Prithviraj which was a commercial success and Koothara (2014) alongside Mohanlal and Bharath. She also featured opposite actor Asif Ali in successive ventures, Mosayile Kuthira Meenukal (2014) and Ithu Thaanda Police (2016). During the period, a further Malayalam film, Edison Photos opposite Nivin Pauly was cancelled.

Janani made a return to Tamil films in 2017 by featuring in the mystery film Adhe Kangal and the horror comedy Balloon. The following year, the long-delayed Vidhi Madhi Ultaa (2018) had a theatrical release, but went unnoticed at the box office. In 2018, she appeared on the Tamil television reality show Bigg Boss Tamil 2 hosted by Kamal Haasan, which is telecasted on Star Vijay.

Filmography

Television

References

External links
 

Actresses from Chennai
Indian film actresses
Tamil actresses
Actresses in Tamil cinema
Actresses in Malayalam cinema
Female models from Chennai
Living people
21st-century Indian actresses
Bigg Boss (Tamil TV series) contestants
Year of birth missing (living people)